Bamori Assembly constituency is one of the 230 Vidhan Sabha (Legislative Assembly) constituencies of Madhya Pradesh state in central India. This constituency came into existence in 2008, following the delimitation of the Legislative Assembly constituencies and covers mostly the area earlier covered by the erstwhile Guna and Shadora constituencies before delimitation.

Overview
Bamori (constituency number 28) is one of the 4 Vidhan Sabha constituencies located in Guna district. This constituency covers part of Guna tehsil of the district.

Bamori is part of Guna Lok Sabha constituency along with seven other Vidhan Sabha segments, namely, Guna in this district, Shivpuri, Pichhore and Kolaras in Shivpuri district and Ashok Nagar, Chanderi and Mungaoli in Ashoknagar district.

Members of Legislative Assembly

As a constituency of Madhya Pradesh

Election Results

2020 bypoll results

2013 results

See also
 Guna district

References

Guna district
Assembly constituencies of Madhya Pradesh